Rohan Greg Ince (born 8 November 1992) is a Montserratian professional footballer who plays for Woking as a holding midfielder. Ince can also play as a central defender.

Club career

Chelsea
Ince joined Chelsea's academy at the age of seven, and helped the side win the 2009–10 FA Youth Cup. He signed his first professional contract with Chelsea in July 2010. As he progressed through the club's youth ranks, Ince began playing as a regular within the club's reserve set-up.

Loan to Yeovil Town
In July 2012, Ince joined League One side Yeovil Town on a six-month loan deal. Ince's Football League debut was delayed due to an injury picked up in pre-season but eventually, on 28 August 2012, Ince made his Yeovil debut as a substitute in the 4–2 League Cup defeat against West Bromwich Albion. On 26 September 2012, Ince was recalled by Chelsea due to a recurrence of ankle and shin injuries.

Brighton & Hove Albion
On 5 February 2013, following a successful trial period with Brighton & Hove Albion, Ince signed an 18-month contract with the development squad.

In the club's pre–season tour ahead of the 2013–14 season, Ince was featured in the first team squad under the new management of Óscar García. He started his first competitive game for Brighton in a 3–1 after extra time defeat to Newport County in the League Cup on 6 August 2013. He made his full league debut for Brighton four days later on 10 August 2013 against Derby County in a 2–1 defeat. He played as a defensive midfielder position in both of these games. Ince then quickly got involved in the first team for the side, where he played in the defensive midfielder position and competed in the first team in the absence of Liam Bridcutt and Keith Andrews. By December, he formed a defensive midfield partnership with Bridcutt. His performance resulted in him signing a contract extension with the club, keeping him until 2016. In the fourth round of FA Cup against Port Vale, Ince scored his first goal for the club, as well as, setting up one of the goals, in a 3–1 win. However, towards the end of the season, he soon suffered injuries, which was followed up by being dropped from the first team. It came after when he was a fault for conceding an opening goal from Blackburn Rovers's Jordan Rhodes and was substituted at half time after suffering a dead leg, as they drew 3–3 and it turned out to be his last appearance for the side this season. At the end of the 2013–14 season, Ince went on to make thirty–three appearances and scoring once in all competitions. For his performance, he was awarded the club's young player of the season award.

In the 2014–15 season, Ince continued to feature in the first team and found himself, where he played in a deeper berth position. However, he appeared in and out of the substitute bench, as well as,  facing new competitions. He then scored his first goal of the season, in a 4–2 win over Swindon Town after the game went extra time in the second round of the League Cup. A month later, on 26 September 2014, he scored again, in a 3–0 win over Burton Albion in the third round of the League Cup. It wasn't until on 10 January 2015 when he scored his first league goal of the season, in a 1–0 win over Charlton Athletic. Weeks later, on 21 January 2015, he set up two goals in three of the three goals in a match against Ipswich Town, as Brighton & Hove Albion won 3–2. By February, Ince continued to establish himself in the midfield position and his performance earned him praised from Manager Chris Hughton. His performance even attracted interests from Premier League clubs, but Hughton dismissed the transfer speculation. Towards the end of the 2014–15 season, Ince soon found himself out of the first team, due to strong competitions that saw him appeared on the substitute bench once again. Nevertheless, Ince ended the 2014–15 season, making thirty–eight appearances and scoring three times in all competitions, he was awarded the club's Goal of the Season.

In the 2015–16 season, Ince remained in the first team, where he mostly featured as a substitute in a number of the matches at the start of the season. As a result, he appeared in a number of matches for the club's development squad. Although he made one start for the side this season, Ince continued to sit out on the substitute bench, as well as, his own injury concerns throughout the first half of the season. Despite this, he, nevertheless, signed a three–year contract with the club.

Despite being told he can leave the club in the summer of the 2016, Ince made his first appearance of the 2016–17 season, season, where he started the whole game as a centre–back position, in a 4–0 win over Colchester United in the first round of the League Cup. However, he remained on the sidelines for every league match in the first half of the season. Despite this, he featured in a number of matches for the League Cup and Football League Trophy, including scoring against Stevenage. He went on to make four appearances for the side during the 2016–17 season.

In June 2018, it was confirmed that Ince would be released by Brighton following the expiry of his contract, and he spent time on trial with Charlton Athletic in the run-up to the 2018–19 season.

Loan to Fulham
On 1 February 2016, Ince moved to Championship club Fulham on loan until the end of the 2015–16 season. He then made his Fulham debut, where he started the match before coming off at half time, in a 1–1 draw against Derby County on 6 February 2016. Ince scored his first goal for the club in a 1–1 draw with Birmingham City on 19 March 2016. Since joining the club, he began receiving a handful of first team football for the side. After making ten appearances and scoring once for the side at the end of the 2015–16 season, he returned to his parent club.

Loan to Swindon Town
With his first team opportunities limited further at Brighton & Hove Albion, it was announced on 31 January 2017 that Ince joined League One side Swindon Town on loan for the remainder of the 2016–17 campaign. He made his Swindon Town debut on 11 February 2017 against Bury, which saw them lose 1–0. It wasn't until on 28 February 2017 when Ince scored his first goal for the club, in a 3–1 win over Gillingham. Since joining the club, Ince established himself in the starting eleven for the side. He then scored his second goal for the club on 22 April 2017, in a 2–1 loss against Scunthorpe United, a game that saw Swindon Town relegated to League Two. Despite missing two matches during his loan spell at Swindon Town, Ince made fourteen appearances and scoring two times in all competitions.

Loan to Bury
On 25 August 2017, Ince joined Bury on loan for the 2017–18 season. He made his Bury debut the next day, where he started the whole game, in a 0–0 draw against Rochdale. However, he was soon plagued between late–September and late–October and was placed on the substitute bench in number of matches. Despite this, he continued to feature in the first team throughout 2017. However, his playing time was soon reduced for the first two months of 2018 but regained towards the end of the season. Ince made 22 league appearances that season where Bury were relegated from League One, finishing bottom. This meant Ince had two consecutive League One relegations.

Cheltenham Town
After missing the 2018–19 season without being contracted to a club and due to a knee injury, on 2 July 2019, Ince signed for Cheltenham Town on a free with a one-year contract. On 3 August 2019, Ince played his first game for over a year in a 1–0 away loss to Leyton Orient. He was shown a straight red on his debut, 2 minutes after teammate, Luke Varney received a second yellow.

Maidenhead United
Ince joined Maidenhead United on 14 November 2020 after a successful trial period, starting the Magpies' game away at Chesterfield the same day. He went on to play 31 times for the Magpies that season.

Woking
On 19 June 2021, following his release from Maidenhead, Ince agreed to join fellow National League side, Woking on a one-year deal. He made his debut on the opening day of the 2021–22 campaign, playing the full 90 minutes during Woking's 2–1 away victory over Wealdstone. Just over a week later, he scored his first goal for the club during a 4–0 away victory against Torquay United, netting the Cards' second in the 4th minute, after team-mate, Tahvon Campbell had given his side the lead a minute prior.

International career
Ince was called up to the Montserrat squad for 2022 FIFA World Cup qualification in March 2021. He made his debut against Antigua and Barbuda on 24 March.

Career statistics

Club

International

''Scores and results list Montserrat's goal tally first.

Honours

Chelsea Reserves

FA Youth Cup: 2009–10

Personal life
Ince is a third cousin to former England international Paul Ince and the nephew of former Wimbledon and Brighton & Hove Albion defender Eric Young. His father passed away in November 2016 and during a 2–1 win over Fulham, Brighton & Hove Albion players  wore black armbands in support for Ince. Growing up, Ince attended Thamesmead School.

In August 2016, Ince was charged by Reading Crown Court for wounding with intent after being accused of smashing a bottle over a bouncer's head on Christmas Day the previous year. At the trial, he  denied carrying out the attack and insisted it was a case of mistaken identity. He was cleared of all charges after he was found not guilty.

References

External links

Living people
1992 births
Footballers from Whitechapel
Montserratian footballers
English footballers
Montserrat international footballers
English people of Montserratian descent
Association football defenders
Association football midfielders
English Football League players
National League (English football) players
Chelsea F.C. players
Yeovil Town F.C. players
Brighton & Hove Albion F.C. players
Fulham F.C. players
Swindon Town F.C. players
Bury F.C. players
Cheltenham Town F.C. players
Maidenhead United F.C. players
Woking F.C. players
Black British sportspeople